Ramazan Döne (born 10 July 1981) is a Turkish handballer who plays for Besiktas Mogaz HT and the Turkey national team.

Achievements   
Turkish Super League:
Winner: 2007, 2009, 2010, 2011, 2012, 2013, 2014, 2015, 2016

Turkish Cup:
Winner: 2009, 2010, 2011, 2012, 2014, 2015, 2016, 2017

Turkish Supercup:
Winner: 2006, 2007, 2010, 2012, 2014, 2015, 2016

Mediterranean Games:
Bronze Medalist: 2013

IHF Emerging Nations Championship:
Finalist: 2017

References 

1981 births
Living people
Sportspeople from Rize
Turkish male handball players
Mediterranean Games bronze medalists for Turkey
Mediterranean Games medalists in handball
Competitors at the 2009 Mediterranean Games
Competitors at the 2013 Mediterranean Games
21st-century Turkish people
20th-century Turkish people